The 2019 term of the Supreme Court of the United States began October 7, 2019, and concluded October 4, 2020. The table below illustrates which opinion was filed by each justice in each case and which justices joined each opinion.

Table key

2019 term opinions

2019 term membership and statistics
This was the fifteenth term of Chief Justice Roberts's tenure. Justice Ginsburg died on September 18, 2020, making it the second and final (and also the only full) term with the same membership.

Notes

References

 
 

Lists of United States Supreme Court opinions by term